Pier Giacomo Castiglioni (22 April 1913–27 November 1968) was an Italian architect and designer.

Early life and education 

Castiglioni was born on 22 April 1913 in Milan, in Lombardy in northern Italy. He was the second son of the sculptor Giannino Castiglioni and his wife Livia Bolla. Castiglioni studied architecture at the Politecnico di Milano and graduated in 1937. His elder brother Livio and younger brother Achille were also architects.

Castiglioni married Maria Coduri de Cartosio on 30 December 1942.

Work and career 

In 1937 or 1938 he started an architectural design practice with his brother Livio and Luigi Caccia Dominioni. Amongst the designs produced by the practice were the first Italian bakelite radio for Phonola. The studio closed in 1940.

After the Second World War he and Livio worked with their younger brother Achille, who had also graduated in architecture in 1944.

Livio Castiglioni left the practice in 1952 or 1953. From then until Pier Giacomo died he and Achille worked as a team; most of their designs are not attributable to either one of them. 

Working alone, Pier Giacomo designed the "Mezzadro" stool for Zanotta based Marcel Duchamp's concept of "ready made". However, it was not manufactured until 1971, three years after Castiglioni's death.

Legacy 

Reflecting on his friendship with the Castiglionis, the designer Massimo Vignelli said:"In reality, the Castiglioni brothers were one person. Symbiosis of thought, creative ability, inspiration and execution were an integral part of their being. Talking to one of them or all three of them was the same, they were completely interchangeable, same voice, same accent, same grin, same laughter, same gestures. They were the Castiglioni, like their work, indivisible fruit of the same research, of the same passion, of a great ability to transform the world around us into a new memorable gesture."

In 2014 the city of Milan named a street after the three Castiglioni brothers (Via Fratelli Castiglioni).

Gallery of works

References

External links 

 Studio Arch. Pier Giacomo Castiglioni
 Pier Giacomo Castiglioni, Museum of Modern Art collection
 
 "The world according to Castiglioni", Domus magazine
 "Achille e Pier Giacomo Castiglioni", RAI Television documentary, Part One (in Italian)
 "Achille e Pier Giacomo Castiglioni", RAI Television documentary, Part Two (in Italian)
 Arco Lamp assembly, short film (narration in French) 

1913 births
1968 deaths
Polytechnic University of Milan alumni
Academic staff of the Polytechnic University of Milan
Architects from Milan
Italian industrial designers
Italian furniture designers
Italian designers
Lighting designers
Industrial design
Designers
Compasso d'Oro Award recipients